The Irani Trophy or Irani Cup, also known as the Mastercard Irani Trophy due to sponsorship reasons, is a first-class cricket tournament organised by the Board of Control for Cricket in India (BCCI). It is played annually between the winners of the Ranji Trophy and a Rest of India cricket team. The Rest of India team includes players from Ranji teams of various states. 

The tournament was conceived during the 1959–60 season to mark the completion of 25 years of the Ranji Trophy championship and was named after the late BCCI president Zal R. Irani, who was associated with the BCCI from its inception in 1928, till his death in 1970.

History
The first match, played between the Ranji Trophy champions and the Rest of India was played in 1959–60 with the trophy being instituted in the name of Zal Irani, long time treasurer and president of the Board of Control for Cricket in India, and a keen patron of the game. For the first few years, it was played towards the end of the season. Realizing the importance of the fixture, the BCCI moved it to the beginning of the season, and from 1965–66 to 2012–13, it was traditionally heralded the start of the new domestic season. In 2013, it was moved to a date immediately after the Ranji Trophy final, resulting in there being two Irani Cup matches the 2012/13 season. The game has since remained at the end of the season, and is played shortly after the Ranji Trophy final. 

In 2022, for the first time in the history of the Irani Trophy, BCCI decided to organise two seasons of the tournament back-to-back (the 2019–20 and 2022–23 trophies), with the matches to be played at Rajkot and Indore respectively.

Winners 
The following table shows the result of Irani Trophy from 1959–60 to 2022–23.

Appearances by team

Broadcasters 
BCCI's official broadcasters Star Sports, Disney+ Hotstar air it live on TV and internet respectively. BCCI's website bcci.tv airs match highlights and scores.

References

External links
A brief history of the Irani Trophy
BCCI Official website
Irani Trophy on SPORT195
Index of all Irani Trophy matches at CricketArchive

 
Indian domestic cricket competitions
First-class cricket competitions